Ashifa Riaz Fatyana (born 7 January 1965) is a Pakistani politician who was the Provincial Minister of Punjab for Women Development, in office from 13 September 2018 till 10 April 2022. She had been a member of the Provincial Assembly of the Punjab from August 2018 till January 2023.

Early life and education
She was born on 7 January 1965.

She graduated from the University of the Punjab in 1990 from where she received the degree of Bachelor of Arts.

Political career
She was elected to the Provincial Assembly of the Punjab as an independent candidate from Constituency PP-88 (Toba Tek Singh-V) in 2002 Pakistani general election. She received 29,559 votes and defeated Nazia Raheel. On 24 November 2003, she was inducted into the provincial Punjab cabinet of Chief Minister Chaudhry Pervaiz Elahi and was appointed as Provincial Minister of Punjab for Women Development, with the additional ministerial portfolio of Human Rights.

In June 2004, she was given the additional ministerial portfolio of social welfare. She served as Minister for Women Development, Human Rights, and Social Welfare till 30 November 2006. On 1 December 2006, she was appointed as Provincial Minister of Punjab for women development.

She was re-elected to the Provincial Assembly of the Punjab as a candidate of Pakistan Tehreek-e-Insaf (PTI) from Constituency PP-122 (Toba Tek Singh-V) in 2018 Pakistani general election.

On 12 September 2018, she was inducted into the provincial Punjab cabinet of Chief Minister Sardar Usman Buzdar. On 13 September 2018, she was appointed as Provincial Minister of Punjab for Women Development.

References

Living people
Punjab MPAs 2002–2007
Punjab MPAs 2018–2023
Pakistan Muslim League (Q) MPAs (Punjab)
Pakistan Tehreek-e-Insaf MPAs (Punjab)
1965 births
Women members of the Provincial Assembly of the Punjab
Provincial ministers of Punjab
Women provincial ministers of Punjab
21st-century Pakistani women politicians